Professor Johanne Erica "Jo" Delahunty,  (born 15 September 1963) is a British barrister, judge, and legal academic. Called to the bar in 1986, she specialises in family law and child protection. She has also been a Recorder since 2009, and was the Gresham Professor of Law from 2016 to 2020.

Early life

Johanne Erica Delahunty was born on 15 September 1963. Although her mother was still legally married to her father, Johanne was born in the unmarried mothers ward, Whittington Hospital, Archway, London, as her father had abandoned her mother while pregnant. She grew up living with her mother, grandmother and grandfather in East Finchley, London, and attended comprehensive schools. She was the first in her family to stay in education beyond the age of 15. She then became the first in her family to attend university, earning herself a place at St Anne’s College, Oxford, to study law in 1982, and subsequently became the first ‘professional’ in the family.

Career in court

Delahunty is one of the UK’s leading family barristers, specialising in child protection law. She rose to prominence, and has won industry awards, for her work in contentious cases involving complex medical evidence and catastrophic injuries contributing to the death of a child, child sex abuse, witchcraft/ritualized abuse and ISIS radicalisation cases. Her clients often have mental health difficulties or serious learning difficulties. Jo acts for children who have been sexually abused and face allegations of sexually abusing others.

Delahunty was called to the Bar in 1986 and, in 2006, was appointed a King's Counsel. She was appointed a Recorder in 2009 and was made a Bencher of Middle Temple in 2011.

Delahunty was a member of the legal team that investigated the Hillsborough disaster and her work led to the conclusions of an inquest that the fans were not to blame and that the inaction of the South Yorkshire Ambulance Service contributed to the number of fatalities.

Career in academia

Delahunty was Gresham Professor of Law from 2016 to 2020, a role that she performed alongside her full-time silk practice at 4 Paper Buildings, Temple, London. The professors of Gresham College give free public lectures, rather than teaching enrolled students. As Gresham Professor of Law, she gives a series of lectures on wide ranging aspects of law which are of public interest.

She was made an Emeritus Gresham Professor of Law in 2020 and awarded a Fellowship in recognition of her contribution to the reputation and reach of the College, expanding its audience to include young men and women and those from disadvantaged and underrepresented groups .

Honours

On 13 March 2019, she was granted the Freedom of the City of London as one of 100 women chosen to celebrate the centenary of the Representation of the People Act 1918.

Recognition & Awards

Group Recipient for the Hillsborough Inquest Family Lawyers*

References

External links
 Have Women Achieved Professional Equality in the Legal Profession? Gresham College lecture 2019]

1963 births
Living people
English King's Counsel
British women judges
21st-century English judges
Professors of Gresham College
21st-century King's Counsel